Sentelie is a commune in the Somme department in Hauts-de-France in northern France.

Geography

Population

Places of interest
 The 15th / sixteenth century church of Saint Nicolas.
 The fifteenth century chapel of Saint Lambert, once a place of pilgrimage.

See also
Communes of the Somme department

References

Communes of Somme (department)